Marco Sala may refer to:
 Marco Sala (footballer, born 1886)
 Marco Sala (footballer, born 1999)